Colbeck Basin is a deep undersea basin of the central Ross Ice Shelf named in association with Cape Colbeck. The name was approved by the Advisory Committee for Undersea Features in June 1988.

References
 

Oceanic basins of the Southern Ocean